Deep Dark Robot is an American rock band from Los Angeles, California, formed in 2010. The band consists of Linda Perry (lead vocals, guitars, bass guitar, keyboards) and Tony Tornay (drums, percussion).

Critical reception
The project's single album, 8 Songs About a Girl, received mixed reviews from critics. Some panned Perry's vocals as too inconsistent and, at times, contrived. Others saw the duo as unrefined, but honest and promising. The album was also noted from its divergence from Perry's typical musical styles.

Discography

8 Songs About a Girl

Music videos

References

External links
 

Rock music groups from California
Custard Records artists
American musical duos
Musical groups established in 2010
2010 establishments in California